This is a list of the Universities and other educational institutions in Trinidad and Tobago.

Universities 

 University of the Southern Caribbean (previously known as Caribbean Union College)
 University of Trinidad and Tobago (UTT)
 University of the West Indies at St. Augustine

Other Educational Institutes
BorderCom International (BCI)
Cipriani College of Labour and Cooperative Studies (CCLCS)
College of Professional Studies (COPS)
CTS College of Business and Computer Science
College of Science, Technology & Applied Arts of Trinidad and Tobago (COSTAATT)
Hugh Wooding Law School (HWLS)
Professional Institute of Marketing and Business Studies Ltd. (PIMBS)
Roytec
SAM Caribbean Limited (SAM)
School of Business and Computer Science (SBCS)
School of International Travel and Languages (SITAL)
Tobago Hospitality and Tourism Institute (THTI)
Trinidad and Tobago Hospitality and Tourism Institute

See also
 List of schools in Trinidad and Tobago

References

Universities
Trinidad And Tobago
Trinidad And Tobago